Rogmocrypta is a spider genus of the jumping spider family, Salticidae.

Description
The short carapace of R. puta is orange, with a black eye area. The oval abdomen is about as long, but not as wide as the carapace. The scutum of males is shiny dark orange. The legs are pale orange.

Species
 Rogmocrypta elegans (Simon, 1885) – New Caledonia
 Rogmocrypta nigella Simon, 1900 – Philippines
 Rogmocrypta puta Simon, 1900 – Singapore

Footnotes

References
  (2000): An Introduction to the Spiders of South East Asia. Malaysian Nature Society, Kuala Lumpur.
  (2007): The world spider catalog, version 8.0. American Museum of Natural History.

Salticidae genera
Salticidae
Taxa named by Eugène Simon
Spiders of Asia
Spiders of Oceania